Statistics of the USFSA Football Championship in the 1913 season.

Tournament

First round
Stade Bordelais UC - Stade limousin (forfeit)
Lyon OU 5-1 Football Club de Grenoble 
Football club de Braux 2-0 Cercle Sportif de Remiremont
AS Trouville-Deauville 3-1 US Le Mans

1/8 Final  
Stade toulousain 1-4 Stade Bordelais UC 
Lyon OU 1-5 Stade Raphaëlois 
Union sportive Servannaise 4-0 CASG Orléans
Amiens SC 0-1 FC Rouen  
Olympique Lillois 2-0 Football club de Braux
SH Marseille 15-0 Stade issoirien
CASG Paris 1-0 AS Trouville-Deauville
Olympique de Cette - Angers Université Club (forfeit)

Quarterfinals 
CASG Paris 3-1 Union sportive Servannaise
Olympique de Cette 6-1 Stade Bordelais UC
FC Rouen 2-1 Olympique Lillois
SH Marseille 4-1 Stade Raphaëlois

Semifinals  
SH Marseille 2-1 Olympique de Cette
FC Rouen 8-1 CASG Paris

Final  
SH Marseille 1-0 FC Rouen

References
RSSF

USFSA Football Championship
1
France